"Chuck Versus the Cat Squad" is the fifteenth episode of the fourth season of Chuck. It originally aired on February 14, 2011. As a surprise, Chuck Bartowski reunites Sarah Walker with her old spy team, the eponymous "C.A.T. Squad", which includes Carina Miller (Mini Anden). The squad flies to Rio de Janeiro to face off against their nemesis Augusto Gaez (Lou Diamond Phillips), but old grudges start to get in the way of the mission. Elsewhere, Morgan Grimes' relationship with Alex McHugh (Mekenna Melvin) is threatened by Carina's return.

Plot

Main plot
The episode begins with a Charlie's Angels-style voice-over which reveals that in 2003 the CIA had a Clandestine Attack Team (abbreviated to "C.A.T. Squad") which included Carina Miller (Mini Anden), Zondra (Mercedes Masohn), Amy (Mircea Monroe), and Sarah Walker. The squad, Sarah later reveals, was disbanded after she found a hidden transmitter in the heel of Zondra's boot and accused her of being a traitor.

The sequence is then revealed to be in Morgan Grimes' imagination, as he listens to Chuck Bartowski describe the squad. After discussing Sarah's estranged family in the previous episode, Chuck decides to surprise her by inviting the C.A.T. Squad to their engagement party. Morgan helps Chuck invite Carina, who contacts Amy and Zondra. Chuck tells Sarah, and she starts panicking, saying that she was a different person. Suddenly, the C.A.T. Squad arrives by helicopter and takes Sarah out to party.

When Chuck wakes up the next morning, he finds Sarah sleeping in a dress after attending several parties across the country. She reveals that the rest of the squad is sleeping in the apartment because they could not find a hotel. Before they awake, Sarah expresses her concern that they cannot trust each other after her accusations of Zondra. As the team leaves, Sarah's car explodes and injures Carina. Chuck flashes on a piece of the bomb in Carina's leg, discovering that Augusto Gaez (Lou Diamond Phillips) was responsible for the bombing. At Castle, General Beckman reveals that Gaez, the squad's nemesis, is a terrorist-for-hire in an organization called the "Gentle Hand". The CIA orders the C.A.T. Squad to extradite Gaez so that he may be tried. Sarah worries that Zondra is working with Gaez, as she had earlier suspected. Meanwhile, Gaez is informed that the squad is coming and reveals that it was all part of a plan.

Sarah reunites with the C.A.T. Squad and infiltrates Gaez's celebration in Rio de Janeiro, Brazil. Chuck and John Casey provide backup, while Carina and Morgan monitor the mission from Castle. As Chuck waits in the van, he reviews CIA files to flash on any intelligence to prove Zondra's innocence or treachery. The squad successfully infiltrates the party, but Gaez's men surround them and tie them up.

After Sarah declines Gaez's offer for the squad to join the Gentle Hand, he brandishes a gun and prepares to kill her. Sarah cuts through her binds with a hidden knife and holds Gaez at knifepoint. Sarah demands to know who the double agent is, but Chuck falls through the window before Gaez can answer. Although Chuck tranquilizes several guards and Gaez is taken into custody, Sarah expresses her anger that she does not know the identity of the traitor. With Zondra and Sarah suspecting each other of treachery, they begin a sparring match to settle their differences. Meanwhile, Casey and Amy interrogate Gaez, who denies all involvement with the Gentle Hand. After Zondra and Sarah convince each other of their innocence, they determine that Amy is the real double agent. Amy incapacitates Casey and attacks Zondra and Sarah with a bō staff.

Amy releases Gaez and they knock Morgan and Carina unconscious. As Chuck arrives at the Buy More with the squad's luggage, Zondra and Sarah wake up and inform him that Gaez and Amy are coming up the elevator. With the Buy More locked down, Chuck crushes several CDs and flashes to use them as throwing stars. He manages to incapacitate Gaez, but Amy jumps on Chuck's back and wrestles him to the ground. When Amy tries to escape, Sarah, Zondra, and Carina stop her and take her into custody.

Sarah and Zondra apologize and mend their friendship. Sarah asks Zondra and Carina to be her bridesmaids, and they accept. Later, Ellie Bartowski hosts Chuck and Sarah's engagement party. Sarah thanks her and they discuss Sarah's strained relationship with her family. They agree to talk about it and inform Chuck later. Sarah then asks Ellie to be her maid of honor, which Ellie eagerly accepts. The episodes closes with a voice-over saying, "Aw, who says cats can't play nice? You never know, maybe we'll add another member to this squad," in reference to Ellie. Chuck watches from a distance and slowly smiles; the screen fades to black.

Morgan and Alex
Morgan initially worries about having Carina and Alex in the same place, as their past relationship would threaten his relationship with Alex McHugh (Mekenna Melvin). However, it is revealed that he has been following her on the internet for some time, only to be ignored. When Morgan wakes up, he finds Carina lying naked in his bed. She attempts to seduce him, but Morgan resists and expresses his anger that she has ignored him for so long. He hurries out the apartment, only to find Alex, who reminds him of their breakfast plans. Morgan explains the situation and Alex agrees to reschedule, but suddenly Carina appears in a bathrobe, making Alex suspicious.

Morgan is later forced to watch an injured Carina, further tempting him. As Carina inquires if Morgan has expressed his love to Alex, Alex arrives in the Buy More to take Morgan to lunch. Morgan explains his assignment, and they reschedule once again.

Morgan prepares to take Alex on an elaborate date, but Carina sabotages the date by rubbing lipstick on his collar. Morgan angrily confronts Carina, but she shrugs it off and asks when he will express his love to Alex, which he admits he must do. When Alex ends their relationship at Chuck and Sarah's engagement party, Morgan tells Alex he loves her and promises to be honest with her. This wins Alex back, and as they warmly hug, Carina apologizes to Alex, who interrupts her halfway through the apology and proceeds to tenderly kiss Morgan.

Music
Songs listed by Alan Sepinwall.
 "Turn It On" by Franz Ferdinand
 "The Parade" by Daniel Indart
 "Eu Quero Agora" by Josephine Bauza
 "Pra Rua" by Rio Funk
 "Rockers to Swallow" by the Yeah Yeah Yeahs
 "Belongings" by Clock Opera
 "Please Ask for Help" by Telekinesis

Reception
"Chuck Versus the Cat Squad" drew 5.64 million viewers.

The episode received positive reviews from critics, though most criticized the predictability that Amy was the traitor. Eric Goldman of IGN gave this episode a score of 8 out of 10, writing, "The opening sequence establishing the CAT Squad (Clandestine Attack Team, of course) was great – a lot of Charlie's Angels mixed with a voice over that was a bit more Hart to Hart, keeping in line that it was Morgan imagining this." Golmdan continued "For now, this was a fun installment, albeit not as inspired as last week."

HitFix writer Alan Sepinwall wrote, "We seem to be falling into a pattern with these bifurcated 'Chuck' seasons, wherein the original 13 episode arc wraps up, and then we get some fun standalones for a bit. 'Chuck vs. the Cat Squad' even had an opening sequence similar in style to the opening of last year's 15th episode, 'Chuck vs. the Role Models,' this time with Morgan imagining Sarah's old team as the stars of a 'Charlie's Angels'-type drama (after last time he dreamed about Chuck and Sarah in 'Hart to Hart.')" Sepinwall concluded, "I'm sure the search into Sarah's past is going to turn into a big arc in and of itself, but for now I'm just happy to have some light, entertaining 'Chuck' episodes."

This episode was rated 8.9 out of 10 by the users of TV.com

References

External links
 

Cat Squad
2011 American television episodes